Smoke is an album by Paul Kelly and Melbourne bluegrass band, Uncle Bill, which was composed of Gerry Hale on guitar, dobro, mandolin, fiddle and vocals, Adam Gare on fiddle, mandolin and vocals, Peter Somerville on banjo and vocals and Stuart Speed on double bass. The album featured a mix of old and new Kelly songs treated in classic bluegrass fashion.

Kelly had previously recorded with Uncle Bill, "Thanks a Lot" for the 1997 compilation, Where Joy Kills Sorrow, on the W.Minc label, and "Sunlander" in 1998 for the Not So Dusty (Slim Dusty) tribute album.

It was released on Kelly's new label, Gawdaggie, through EMI Records in Australia in October 1999 and peaked at #36 on the national chart.

"Our Sunshine" draws upon the story of Ned Kelly's life, in particular the 1991 book by Robert Drewe, Our Sunshine and Ned Kelly: A Short History by Ian Jones.

Smoke won three awards from the Victorian Country Music Association Best Group (Open), Best Group (Victorian), and Album of the Year in 2000.

Track listing
All tracks written by Paul Kelly, except where noted.

Personnel
 Paul Kelly – vocals, guitar
 Gerry Hale – guitar, mandolin, fiddle, dobro, lap steel, vocals
 Adam Gare – mandolin, fiddle, vocals
 Peter Somerville – banjo, vocals
 Stuart Speed – double bass, vocals

Credits
 Produced by Paul Kelly and Gerry Hale
 Mixed by Simon Polinski
 Assisted by Christian Scallon & Adam Rhodes
 Mastered by Ross Cockle
 Design & Photography - Ben Cunningham
 Cover Art by Reg Mombassa

Charts

References

1999 albums
EMI Records albums
Paul Kelly (Australian musician) albums